Lorenz Funk Sr. (17 March 1947 in Bad Tölz – 29 September 2017 in Greiling) was an ice hockey player who played for the West German national team. He won a bronze medal at the 1976 Winter Olympics.

He came back from retirement to play with his sons Florian and Lorenz Jr.

Career

As a player Funk played with two teams in both Oberliga and Berlin-Liga leagues:

 EC Bad Tölz 1965–1972, 1989–1990
 BSC Preussen 1972–1981, 1983–1986, 1988, 2003
 Riessersee SC 1982–1983

As head coach he coached both his old teams and two other German professional teams:

 BSC Preussen 1983–1984, 1986–1987
 EC Bad Tölz 1988–1990
 SV Bayreuth 1900–1991 (Eishockey-Bundesliga league)
 Eisbären Berlin 1991–2000

He was manager, director and eventually president of the Berlin Capitals.

Awards

 1990 Bundesverdienstkreuz (Federal Cross of Merit).

References

External links
 
 
 
 

1947 births
2017 deaths
Ice hockey players at the 1968 Winter Olympics
Ice hockey players at the 1972 Winter Olympics
Ice hockey players at the 1976 Winter Olympics
Medalists at the 1976 Winter Olympics
Olympic bronze medalists for West Germany
Olympic ice hockey players of West Germany
Olympic medalists in ice hockey
West German ice hockey forwards
Recipients of the Cross of the Order of Merit of the Federal Republic of Germany
People from Bad Tölz
Sportspeople from Upper Bavaria
German ice hockey forwards